Michael Benedict may refer to:

Michael Les Benedict, American historian
Michael Benedict, character in Lost in the Garden
Mike Benedict, character in 7 Faces of Dr. Lao

See also
Michael Benedikt (disambiguation)